Abingdon Airport , also known as Abingdon Downs Airport, is an airport in Abingdon Downs, Shire of Etheridge, Queensland, Australia.

Facilities

See also
 List of airports in Queensland

References

Airports in Queensland
Shire of Etheridge